Wolfmother are an Australian hard rock band formed in Sydney, New South Wales in 2000. Originally a trio featuring vocalist and guitarist Andrew Stockdale, bassist and keyboardist Chris Ross, and drummer Myles Heskett, the group released their self-titled debut album in Australia in 2005, with all 12 tracks credited equally to all three band members. Four songs – "Dimension", "Woman", "White Unicorn" and "Apple Tree" – had originally been released on the band's self-titled debut EP the previous year. When Wolfmother was released internationally in 2006, it also featured "Love Train". In May 2007, the band contributed "Pleased to Meet You" to the Spider-Man 3 soundtrack.

Ross and Heskett left Wolfmother in August 2008. Returning with new members Ian Peres (bass, keyboards), Aidan Nemeth (rhythm guitar) and Dave Atkins (drums), the band released the single "Back Round" in March 2009, followed by their second album Cosmic Egg in October, the songwriting for which was credited entirely to Stockdale. In March 2010, the band contributed the song "Fell Down a Hole" to the Almost Alice soundtrack, before Atkins announced his departure the following month.

With Will Rockwell-Scott replacing Atkins, Wolfmother began working on their third album in 2011, although the resulting album Keep Moving was eventually released in 2013 as Andrew Stockdale's solo debut. The band returned later in the year as a trio composed of Stockdale, Peres and drummer Vin Steele, and began working on their official third album. New Crown was released independently in March 2014, featuring ten songs written by Stockdale. The band's fourth album Victorious was released in February 2016, with songwriting again credited to Stockdale alone (with the exception of "Gypsy Caravan", which was co-written by Spiderbait drummer Kram).

Songs

See also
Wolfmother discography

Footnotes

References

External links
List of Wolfmother songs at AllMusic

Wolfmother